Malik Migara is a Sri Lankan international footballer who plays as a forward for Navy in the Sri Lanka Football Premier League.

Migara played for Sri Lanka at the 2010 AFC Challenge Cup. His two international goals came against Mongolia.

International goals 

Scores and results list Nepal's goal tally first.

References

Sri Lankan footballers
Ratnam SC players
1989 births
Living people
Sri Lanka international footballers
Sri Lanka Navy SC (football) players
Association football forwards
Sri Lanka Football Premier League players